AIR FM Rainbow is a group of FM radio channels across India. The group of stations was previously called FM Metro,  but the name was changed to FM Rainbow in 2002. The group is run by All India Radio, or AIR, a government owned enterprise. It features Hindi and regional language songs, while also playing English music and providing hourly news in English, regional language and/or Hindi. In Bhopal, FM Rainbow broadcasts in Hindi to more than 12 districts of Madhya Pradesh and 21 Bhopal City suburbs.  AIR FM Rainbow Delhi airs in as many as ten cities, more than any of the other FM Rainbow frequencies. Mumbai, Lucknow, Vizag, Hyderabad, Vijayawada, Kakinada, Kochi and Bangalore all receive FM Rainbow transmissions on a variety of frequencies.

Rainbow stations are widely accessible due not only to their strong FM signals that carry transmissions to numerous villages in addition to urban areas, but also to FM Rainbow's commitment to providing diverse programming. Rainbow FM stations plays ghazals, soundtracks, and a variety of programs featuring Western music, both popular music and classical music. Some such programs are "Time Out," "Take Off," "Footloose," and "Wicked Hour."  FM Rainbow's variety of programming is unique for an Indian radio station, yet almost all the disc jockeys (locally known as "radio jockeys," or RJs) on private Indian FM stations got their start at FM Rainbow. Programming is provided on a rotating schedule, accessible from the All India Radio website, along with the frequencies available in different regions. FM Rainbow channels are also available to tune in from Prasar Bharati DTH channels across the country for listeners outside the bandwidth.

History

AIR launched the FM Rainbow channel on 01.02.1993. This was a channel to cater primarily to the young listener on the move. The Radio Jockey (RJ) replaced the Announcer. The presentation style became fast-paced and informal to suit the changing listener profile.  The vibrant programming and quality reception caught the imagination of the youngsters and allured them to come closer to their radio. In its round the clock broadcast, radio listeners were served with a varied menu of new formats of entertainment. Now Air RAINBOW served with a varied menu of new formats of entertainment.

At present AIR has 206 FM transmitters across the country, by which it covers 24.94% of the area and 36.81% of the population of the country. FM Rainbow is originated from 17 centers, at Delhi, Mumbai, Chennai, Kolkata, Bangalore-Kannada Kamanabilu, Lucknow, Panaji, Jalandhar, Cuttack, Kodaikanal, Tiruchirapalli, Coimbatore, Vishakhapatnam, Puducherry, Vijayawada, Goa and Tirunelveli.  AIR Delhi Rainbow is relayed fully from Mussorie, Kanpur, Aligarh, Kasauli, Kurseong, Leh, Aurangabad, Kochi, Cherrapunji and Shillong and partly from Hyderabad, Bhadrava, Poonch, Rajauri, Naushera, RK Srinagar, RK Jammu, Jhansi, Dharamshala, and Bhatinda. The programming of FM Rainbow includes Pop music, Film songs,  Classical & Devotional music, News Headlines, informal chat shows, phone-in programmes etc. AIR FM Rainbow commands an impressive listening and holds its own among private FM Channels.

The channel currently also runs in top 25 countries which includes  includes European countries France, Switzerland, Finland, Netherlands and Germany, neighbouring countries like Pakistan, Bangladesh and Nepal to West Asian countries Israel, Saudi Arabia, UAE, Qatar, Bahrain, Kuwait and Oman.

News bulletins on FM ‘Rainbow’ channel

The News Services Division is putting out news headlines on FM ‘Rainbow’ channel from Delhi from 28 May 1995. Twenty four news headline bulletins on FM ‘Rainbow’ are broadcast round-the-clock from Delhi. The duration of each headline FM ‘Rainbow’ bulletin from Delhi is one minute approx. At present 22 AIR stations are broadcasting FM Headlines.

FM Rainbow India

AIR FM Rainbow India was formerly known as AIR FM Rainbow Delhi. It was rebranded with new look targeting audience of not only Delhi but also entire India. It also changed its programming pattern & presentation also.

Main genres of programmes are Bollywood music and Western music. It airs total 4 hours of Western music. Besides this it airs Music shows, Request shows, Interviews & Information programmes in Hindi with Filmi Music. AIR FM Rainbow India Headlines are broadcast every hour at starting of programme according to its language i.e. Hindi or English.

After rebranded as AIR FM Rainbow India, it started a new programme called Good Morning India which airs at 07:00 am to 09:00 am. It includes News, Interviews, Health, Programme Summary with upbeat Filmi Music targeting all Indian audiences.

Programmes

Hindi
 Good Morning India 7:00am(tue) RJs Satya and Chitra
 Hotline 10:00am
 Bollywood trails 11:00am(mon-sat) rj nikhil barma
 Aashiyana 1:00pm(tue)RJ Tapasaya 
 On Air Mehmaan rj santosh rao 10am
 Bindass Bol (Friday)3:00pm rj priti mohan
 Helpline(mon-fri) rj bharti dang 3.00pm rajshree trivedi
 Parwaaz Hai Kaam Tera 4:00pm
 Citylights 5:00pm
 Message Masala Mix 7:00pm (sun-thurs)RJ Sujata
 Party time 8:00pm
 Aradhana

English
 Play It Cool
 Matchless Music Hour
Breakfree

FM Rainbow Mumbai

FM Rainbow Mumbai is an FM radio station run by All India Radio Mumbai. It is music radio channel. It is available on 107.1 MHz frequency & also it can be tunned through DTH services.

Programmes are mainly Music show hosted by RJs. Main languages of shows are Hindi, English & Marathi. Morning slot is of Marathi songs 05:00 am to 08:00 am. In this slot, there is a feast of Golden Marathi Religious & Classic songs. English slots are reserved for Western music. Other than this there is Hindi slot between 11:00 am to 04:00 pm at Noon & 07:00 pm to 10:00 pm. Bollywood songs are showcased in this slot. AIR FM Rainbow Headlines are broadcast at the start of every hour's programme.

A famous show Celebrating Life with FM Rainbow  is also aired on every Friday at 07:00 pm which is an interview of famous personality.

FM Rainbow Lucknow

AIR FM Rainbow Lucknow is an FM radio station run by All India Radio Lucknow. It is available on 100.7 MHz frequency.

AIR FM Lucknow made its debut on 20 August 2000 at 1900 hours with Rashi Badalia (now K Rashi Badalia Kumar) as its first Radio Jockey/Presenter with her signature announcement "Wherever you are and whatever you do, your audio aids are tuned into AIR FM Hundred point Seven Megahertz" on its first show Pop Time.The first song that went on air was 'My heart is beating' from the film Julie. Rajiv Saxena, Programme Executive, Delhi & Vijay Deepak Chibbar, Programme Executive, Mumbai were the two senior broadcasters who facilitated launch of the channel in Lucknow. It was formally inaugurated by Minister of State for Information & Broadcasting Arun Jaitley in Lucknow. Dr Satish Grover was the Station Director & Satyendra Singh was the FM Programme Executive at the time of the launch. A few famous shows which ran on AIR FM Rainbow over the years are Pop Time, Hullo FM, Mera Wala 10, Old Melodies & FM Top 10. Rajiv Saxena was the host of Hullo FM & Old Melodies in the initial days.

FM Rainbow Bengaluru

FM Rainbow Chennai

 Network Neram

FM Rainbow Tiruchirappalli

 Vanna Kolangal
 SMS-il Iniya Geethangal
 Vasantha Azhaippu
 Masala Mix
 Kadhamba Malargal
 Thitthikkum Thenmalai
 Idhaya Ragam
 Mathura Geetham
 Paatu Thaan
 Mangaiyer Ulagam

References

Radio stations in Kolkata

External links
All India Radio's official site

All India Radio
Hindi-language radio stations
Telugu-language radio stations
Tamil-language radio stations
Radio stations in Hyderabad
Radio stations in Vijayawada